Greeson is a surname. Notable people with the surname include:

Greg M. Greeson, American automotive designer and entrepreneur
Todd Greeson (born 1971), American politician

See also
 Lake Greeson

English-language surnames